Diabolical Fullmoon Mysticism is the debut studio album by Norwegian black metal band Immortal. It was released on 1 July 1992 through Osmose Productions. It is the only album to feature Armagedda on drums.

Release 
The album was issued as a standard CD, a limited edition LP, a limited edition picture disc and a limited edition cassette tape. The picture disc was later reissued by Osmose Productions in 1998 and the regular LP was reissued in 2005.

Critical reception 

John Serba of AllMusic said, "Diabolical Fullmoon Mysticism presents the germ of a soon-to-be-great black metal outfit", calling it "as rancid and unholy as other early Norse efforts, albeit a hair more melodic and listenable than some of its peers", though "one's time is much better spent with subsequent albums."

Track listing

Personnel 
Immortal
 Abbath Doom Occulta – bass guitar, vocals
 Demonaz Doom Occulta – electric guitar, acoustic guitar, album layout
 Armagedda – drums

Additional personnel
 Eirik Hundvin – engineering
 Immortal – production, album photos
 J. W. H. – logo, album front cover
 Stein Kare – album back cover photo

References

External links 
 

Immortal (band) albums
1992 debut albums
Osmose Productions albums